is a railway station in Monastir, Tunisia.

The station's platforms are on two sides of a triangular railway junction. Trains from the station run on the electrified, metre-gauge Sahel Metro line and serve Sousse to the north and Mahdia to the south, as well as Monastir.

The station lies between Skanes-Monastir airport station to the west, the city-centre Gare Habib Bourguiba Monastir to the east, and Monastir Industrial Zone to the south.

References

Railway stations in Tunisia
Transport in Tunisia